Pre-popping is a method of transferring lead information from one online lead form to another. This method is most commonly used for internet marketing between a publisher and an advertiser in the lead generation industry.

User experience
The user experience with the pre-popping method is that a user fills out a lead form on a publisher website before he leaves the publisher domain and upon clicking on the 'submit' button he is redirected to the landing page of the advertiser where a similar or a longer form is already populated with the same information he already entered.

Benefits

The benefit of pre-popping to the publisher is that only users who are very interested in the offer are leaving the website so the post click conversion rates are high so he enjoys higher commissions while allowing more users to stay on his site and make him revenue in other ways.

The benefits of pre-popping to the advertiser is that he only gets high value users so conversion rates and user values are high.

In the risk taking scale, pre-popping can be placed between CPC and CPL. Pre-popping means that the publisher is taking more risk compared to CPM or CPC and less than CPL, CPA, CPS or rev-sharing while the advertiser assumes the higher risk with CPM and CPL compared pre-popping.

Implementation
The technical aspects of pre-popping are quite simple. The information is normally transferred as a query string which is an extension to the URL of the landing page. On the publisher side, it requires an advertisement in the form of a banner that presents a few fields to the user and validates the user input before allowing him to click ‘submit’. This can be implemented in Flash (ActionScript, SWF) or in JavaScript. On the advertiser side, this can be easily done with a JavaScript code.

See also 
 Lead generation
 Internet marketing
 Advertising

Digital marketing